Commissioners Park may refer to:
Commissioners Park (Ottawa), an urban park in the Canadian capital
Commissioners Park (Naperville, Illinois), a multi-sport recreational area in the Chicago metropolitan area